Einstein's Cosmos: How Albert Einstein's Vision Transformed Our Understanding of Space and Time is a popular science book by Michio Kaku first published in 2004. In the book Kaku discusses Albert Einstein's work, life and concepts such as E=mc² as well as special relativity.

References

2004 non-fiction books
Books by Michio Kaku
Popular physics books
Books about Albert Einstein